was a retainer of the Japanese clan of Ōkubo following the Azuchi-Momoyama period of the 17th century. Following the conspiracy of the Ōkubo clan against the authority of the Tokugawa Shogunate, Tadayoshi along with many others under the Ōkubo were dispossessed of their personal holdings.

References

The Samurai Sourcebook

Samurai
Daimyo
1594 births
1622 deaths
Satomi clan